Lakereia is a former municipality in the Larissa regional unit, Thessaly, Greece. Since the 2011 local government reform it is part of the municipality Agia, of which it is a municipal unit. Population 1,481 (2011). The seat of the municipality was in Dimitra. The municipal unit has an area of 179.386 km2.

References

Populated places in Larissa (regional unit)

el:Δήμος Αγιάς#Λακέρειας